Lauren Brazzale (born 5 November 1993) is an Australian rules footballer playing for Collingwood in the AFL Women's competition (AFLW). She was drafted by Carlton with the club's eighth selection and the sixty second overall in the 2016 AFL Women's draft. She made her debut in Round 1, 2017, in the club and the league's inaugural match at Ikon Park against . Brazzale finished 2017 having played in all seven of Carlton's matches that season.

In June 2022, Brazzale was traded to Carlton in exchange for Amelia Velardo.

Statistics
Statistics are correct to the end of the S7 (2022) season.

|- 
! scope="row" style="text-align:center" | 2017
|style="text-align:center;"|
| 12 || 7 || 1 || 0 || 39 || 7 || 46 || 8 || 15 || 0.1 || 0.0 || 5.6 || 1 || 6.6 || 1.1 || 2.1
|- 
! scope="row" style="text-align:center" | 2018
|style="text-align:center;"|
| 12 || 5 || 0 || 3 || 25 || 6 || 31 || 3 || 11 || 0.0 || 0.6 || 5.0 || 1.2 || 6.2 || 0.6 || 2.2
|- 
! scope="row" style="text-align:center" | 2019
|style="text-align:center;"|
| 12 || 8 || 0 || 4 || 68 || 15 || 83 || 13 || 18 || 0.0 || 0.5 || 8.5 || 1.9 || 10.4 || 1.6 || 2.3
|- 
! scope="row" style="text-align:center" | 2020
|style="text-align:center;"|
| 12 || 7 || 2 || 2 || 57 || 11 || 68 || 17 || 17 || 0.3 || 0.4 || 8.1 || 1.6 || 9.7 || 2.4 || 2.4
|- 
! scope="row" style="text-align:center" | 2021
|style="text-align:center;"|
| 12 || 9 || 4 || 1 || 72 || 13 || 85 || 25 || 20 || 0.4 || 0.1 || 8.0 || 1.4 || 9.4 || 2.8 || 2.2
|- 
! scope="row" style="text-align:center" | 2022
|style="text-align:center;"|
| 12 || 5 || 0 || 0 || 40 || 16 || 56 || 9 || 9 || 0.0 || 0.0 || 8.0 || 3.2 || 11.2 || 1.8 || 1.8
|- 
! scope="row" style="text-align:center" | S7 (2022)
|style="text-align:center;"|
| 24 || 11 || 0 || 0 || 70 || 23 || 93 || 27 || 18 || 0.0 || 0.0 || 6.4 || 2.1 || 8.5 || 2.5 || 1.6
|- class="sortbottom"
! colspan=3| Career
! 52
! 7
! 10
! 371
! 91
! 462
! 102
! 108
! 0.1
! 0.2
! 7.1
! 1.8
! 8.9
! 2.0
! 2.1
|}

References

External links

Living people
1993 births
Carlton Football Club (AFLW) players
Australian rules footballers from Victoria (Australia)
Sportswomen from Victoria (Australia)
Victorian Women's Football League players